Paragunnellichthys  is a genus of wormfishes native to the Indian Ocean and the western Pacific Ocean.

Species
There are currently two recognized species in this genus on Fishbase with a third recognised by other authorities: 

 Paragunnellichthys fehlmanni C.E. Dawson, 1969
 Paragunnellichthys seychellensis C.E. Dawson, 1969 (Seychelles wormfish)
 Paragunnellichthys springeri C.E. Dawson, 1969

References

Microdesmidae
Gobiidae
Marine fish genera
Taxa named by Charles Eric Dawson